The 1996 North Dakota gubernatorial election took place on November 5, 1996. Incumbent Republican Ed Schafer won re-election to a second term as Governor of North Dakota, defeating Democratic-NPL nominee Lee Kaldor.

Results

References

North Dakota
1996
gubernatorial